At least three species share the name Kočevje subterranean spider:
Troglohyphantes gracilis
Troglohyphantes similis
Troglohyphantes spinipes

Animal common name disambiguation pages